
The following is a list of Playboy Playmates of 1974, the 20th anniversary year of the publication. Playboy magazine names their Playmate of the Month each month throughout the year.

January

Nancy Cameron (born March 15, 1954 in Pittsburgh, Pennsylvania) is an American model and actress. She was chosen as Playboy magazine's Playmate of the Month for the January 1974 issue, Playboy's 20th anniversary issue. Cameron appeared in a double-sided centerfold, with both her nude front and back visible. Her centerfold was photographed by Dwight Hooker. On the cover of the May 1976 issue, she appears in front of the 1886 painting by Georges Seurat, Sunday Afternoon on the Island of La Grande Jatte, posed similarly to the main character in that composition.

February

Francine Parks (born January 30, 1951 in Mobile, Alabama) is an American model. She was Playboy magazine's Playmate of the Month for the February 1974 issue. Her centerfold was photographed by Mario Casilli.

March

Pamela Zinszer (born September 6, 1955 in Kansas) is an American model. She was Playboy magazine's Playmate of the Month for the March 1974 issue. Her centerfold was photographed by Mario Casilli.

April

Marlene Morrow (born March 15, 1954) is an American model. She was Playboy magazine's Playmate of the Month for the April 1974 issue. Her centerfold was photographed by Larry Dale Gordon.

May

Marilyn Lange (born January 12, 1952 in Westfield, New Jersey) is a model chosen by Playboy magazine as the Playmate of the Month for May 1974, and later, the 1975 Playmate of the Year. The Playmate of the Year pictorial was featured in the June 1975 issue, and both of her pictorials were photographed by Dwight Hooker.

At that time, she lived in Hawaii and played soccer. As a publicity stunt, the Chicago Sting of the men's North American Soccer League selected her in the final round of the 1976 draft.  Although she never played for them, she did work in the promotions department.

June

Sandy Johnson (born July 7, 1954 in San Antonio, Texas) is an American model and actress. She was Playboy magazine's Playmate of the Month for the June 1974 issue. Her centerfold was photographed by Mario Casilli. Johnson's acting credits include 1978's Halloween as Judith Myers.

July

Carol Vitale (born November 14, 1946 in Elizabeth, New Jersey, died July 23, 2008 in Aventura, Florida) was an American model and television program hostess/personality. She was Playboy magazine's Playmate of the Month for its July 1974 issue. Her centerfold was photographed by David Chan. In all, she appeared in three Playboy pictorials, as well as the cover of the August 1972 issue. She came to Playboy's attention while working as a Bunny at the Miami Playboy Club.

Vitale died on July 23, 2008 at her condo in Aventura, Florida as a result of complications from lupus, scleroderma, and osteoporosis.

August

Jeane Manson, born Jean Manson, (born October 1, 1950 in Cleveland, Ohio) is an American model, singer and actress. She was Playboy magazine's Playmate of the Month for the August 1974 issue. Her centerfold was photographed by Dwight Hooker.

Performing under the name Jeane Manson, she became a recording artist in Europe, hosted television specials in France and had a regular role on the long-running primetime soap Riviera. She represented Luxembourg in the 1979 Eurovision Song Contest.

September

Kristine Hanson (born September 23, 1951 in Illinois) is an American television broadcaster who also was Playboy magazine's Playmate of the Month for the September 1974 issue. Her centerfold was photographed by David Chan.

She won an Emmy Award and a first place award for American Women in Radio and Television.

October

Ester Cordet (born December 31, 1946 in Panama) is a Panamanian-born model. She was Playboy magazine's Playmate of the Month for the October 1974 issue. Her centerfold was photographed by Richard Fegley. Cordet was also the cover model for the Ohio Players album, Honey.

At the time the issue was published, and during the shooting, Esther Cordet (real name Esther Sgobba) was married. Her husband, who was in the background of one of the photos, was described in the cut line as a "friend". She was also the mother of a four-year-old son. 
At the time of the photo shoot and the magazine's release she was employed as a flight attendant at Pacific Southwest Airlines.

November

Bebe Buell (born Beverle Lorence Buell on July 14, 1953, in Portsmouth, Virginia) is an American fashion model and singer, and Playboy magazine's November 1974 Playmate of the Month. She is also known for dating and marrying rock musicians. She is actress Liv Tyler's mother from a brief relationship with Aerosmith vocalist Steven Tyler (although Buell initially claimed the father was Todd Rundgren).

In 2001, she wrote an autobiography (with Victor Bockris) entitled Rebel Heart: An American Rock and Roll Journey. The book was a New York Times bestseller.

Filmmaker Cameron Crowe, in his commentary on the extended DVD of his 2000 movie Almost Famous, said he based the film's "Penny Lane" character (played by Kate Hudson) in part on Buell.

December

Janice Raymond (born March 25, 1951) is an English model. She was selected as Playboy magazine's Playmate of the Month for its December 1974 issue.

See also
 List of people in Playboy 1970–1979

Notes

References

1974-related lists
1974
Playmates Of 1974